Clementsport is a community in the Canadian province of Nova Scotia, located in Annapolis County. It is on the southern shore of the Annapolis Basin and is on Nova Scotia Trunk 1.

The village was established originally as Clements Township by United Empire Loyalists from Long Island, NY, who came to the region at the end of the American Revolution, c. 1785. Its original boundaries extended southwest to the Bear River, south to what was originally called the Hessian Line and is now the Clementsvale Road, and northeast as far as Allain's Creek at the edge of Annapolis Royal. This area included what is now the village of Deep Brook, the village of Cornwallis Park on the site of the former CFB Cornwallis, and Upper Clements Parks. Several homes and churches in the village date to the late 18th and early 19th century.

Formerly an industrial town, Clementsport was the site of extensive wooden shipbuilding, and had an iron smelting factory and dockworks at the mouth of the Moose River. Stores and residences were built out over the river on wooden pilings and stilts, similar to the still-existing structures in the nearby village of Bear River.

The decline of wooden shipbuilding led to the decline of the town, and none of the structures that were built over the river remain. More recent economic decline in the region has led to the closure of several local businesses, including a gas station, convenience stores, a pizzeria, art galleries, and a bed and breakfast.

Clementsport is situated on the Annapolis Basin, along the Moose River. It is at roughly the half-way point between Annapolis Royal and Digby, along Highway 1.

Local Attractions

The Clementsport branch of the Royal Canadian Legion offers a full supper every Friday night and provides a variety of entertainment including live music, cards, crafts and social groups. It serves as a community centre, hosting meetings of groups like the Clements Historical Society and the garden club.

Some locals may be able to direct visitors to the scenic Clementsport Waterfall.

Clementsport has a rug hooking studio, located in the former Community Center on Clementsport Road, and also has two antique shops.

There is also a post office in Clementsport.

Where Route 1 crosses the Moose River, the site of the long-gone shops of Clementsport, there are two memorials:

The first commemorates the exploits of fourteen Clementsport sea captains from the Rawding family. The plaque on the memorial lists the captains' names and dates (between 1771 and 1964), and adds:

"These sea captains, all resident in this locality and members of the one family, roamed the seven seas for 150 years and had under their command some of the largest vessels then existing."

The second cairn, topped by a huge hammer, commemorates the Annapolis Iron Mining Company. The plaque states:

"The trip hammer on which this plaque is placed is all that remains of the Annapolis Iron Mining Company operations. The iron mine was situated three miles south of this location and ore transported in trucks drawn by horses on a railway with rails of maple wood. The extensive stone and brick buildings for smelting and iron working were situated on the eastern side of the mouth of this river. Operations started in 1825 and terminated in 1862."

Former Residents of Note

Clementsport is the birthplace of Edward P. Morse, the industrialist and proprietor of the Morse Dry Dock and Repair Company of New York.

Famous actress Theda Bara visited her parents regularly in this community.

Country legend Wilf Carter spent his summers, as a youth, in Clementsport, visiting relatives who lived in the community.

Gloria Roth, a square-dance caller and organizer of the Maritime Callers' Association, ran an annual square-dance camp at "The House of Roth" for over 30 years, starting around 1970. People traveled to Clementsport from all over North America for the summer activities. Roth was inducted into the Square Dance Foundation of New England's Hall of Fame in 2002.

References

Communities in Annapolis County, Nova Scotia